Ante Kostelić (born 11 August 1938) is a Croatian former handball player, and handball and skier coach. He is best known for coaching his children, Croatian skiers Janica and Ivica Kostelić, who won the FIS Alpine World Ski Championships, overall FIS Alpine World Cup and Olympic titles between 2001 and 2014. As head coach of the ŽRK Osijek handball club he won the 1981–82 IHF Women's Cup Winners' Cup. He has been honoured with numerous awards including the Croatian Olympic Committee's Matija Ljubek Award (2001), Franjo Bučar State Award for Sport (2003) and the Order of Duke Branimir.

Early life

Born in Zagreb, Ante Kostelić attended Grammar school in his home town and later graduated from the Faculty of Kinesiology. He played handball for several clubs in Croatia (then within Yugoslavia), e.g. RK Polet Zagreb, RK Mladost Zagreb, RK Zagreb, as well as in France (AS Cannes). His player positions were circle runner (pivot, line player) or left winger. As an RK Zagreb player, he won the Yugoslav Handball Cup in 1962. He was also active in swimming, skiing and car racing.

Coaching career

From the 1970s to the 1990s, Kostelić coached many handball clubs, including RK Ivanić Ivanić-Grad, RK Medveščak Zagreb, RK Zagreb, RK Partizan Bjelovar, RK Trešnjevka Zagreb, RK Celje, ŽRK Osijek, RK Pelister Bitola and 1. FC Nürnberg Nuremberg. In his coaching career, he first became famous for his triumph in the 1981–82 IHF Women's Cup Winners' Cup as ŽRK Osijek Handball Club head coach. In the final, ŽRK Osijek beat SC Spartacus from Budapest 54:38 on aggregate.

At the beginning of the 1990s he became an alpine skiing coach, starting with the ski clubs SK Medveščak and SK Zagreb. He was known as a very tough and demanding coach and therefore sometimes got into confrontations with other club members or parents of the skiers, who thought he demanded too much from his trainees. Then he took over coaching his children Janica and Ivica), who succeeded at the highest levels of the sport, becoming world alpine ski world champions as well as World Cup and Olympic winners. Together they were awarded four gold and six silver Olympic medals. In April 2017 it was announced that Kostelić would become coach of the Croatian alpine skiers Elias and Samuel Kolega.

Honours and awards

Ante Kostelić has been honoured by the Croatian Olympic Committee with the Matija Ljubek Award, the highest COC prize, awarded to individuals as a lifetime achievement, in 2001. Two years later he was honoured with the Franjo Bučar State Award for Sport, the highest recognition that Republic of Croatia gives for extraordinary achievements in the field of sport in Croatia. In 2010 he received the Order of Prince Branimir, which is given for excellence in promoting Croatia's international relations. In addition, the Croatian Olympic Committee elected him several times as Croatia's coach of the year (2002, 2006, 2010, 2014).

See also

 List of Croatian sportspeople
 Croatia at the Olympics
 Croatia at the 2002 Winter Olympics
 Croatia at the 2006 Winter Olympics

References

External links
Ante Kostelić honoured with the Order of Duke Branimir in 2010 (in Croatian)
Ante Kostelić coached her daughter Janica who won a gold medal at the 2002 Winter Olympics
Croatian Sensation's father and head coach
Kostelić elected as Croatia's best coach by Croatian Olympic Committee (in Croatian)
Kostelić skiing family film *Short biography on IMDb
Kostelić family: born to be successful (in Croatian)
Ante Kostelić - a former skier and international handball player
Kostelić – former Monsieur Handball in France (in Croatian)
A. Kostelić among members of the Croatian Olympic Delegation in Vancouver 2010
Legendary coach, Ante Kostelić, explains athlete development (video)

Croatian alpine skiing coaches
Alpine skiing coaches
Croatian handball coaches
Croatian male handball players
RK Zagreb players
1938 births
Living people
Handball players from Zagreb
20th-century Croatian people